The need for Islamic banking and finance has grown in Canada due to the growing Muslim population in the country who want to avoid riba and other financial practices in violation of sharia. These sharia-compliant financial products are not offered by main financial institutions and, thus, small financial companies are major players. However, major companies like WealthSimple are starting to embrace the idea.

History

Islamic mortgage fraud 
A Toronto-based financial company UM Financial started giving Sharia-compliant loans to Muslims in 2005 in partnership with Central 1 Credit Union of Vancouver. The company planned to offer no-interest MasterCard as well. UM financial was ordered to go into receivership by the Ontario Superior Court on October 7, 2011. Omar Kalair and Yusuf Panchbaya of UM Financial were charged by RCMP for $4.3-million mortgage fraud, but both men were acquitted of all counts contained in the indictment in Ontario Superior Court June 7, 2019.

Islamic financial products

Mortgage products

Investment products

Roboadvisors/ Investments Managers 
Some institutions have started offering accounts including Registered Education Savings Plan (RESP), Registered Retirement Savings Plan (RRSP), Tax-Free Savings Account (TFSA) etc.

See also 
 Islamic banking and finance
 Islamic finance products, services and contracts
 Challenges in Islamic finance
 Accounting and Auditing Organization for Islamic Financial Institutions (AAOIFI)

References

External links 
 https://zoya.finance/

Islamic banking
Sharia investment